This is a list of French television related events from 1969.

Events
29 March - France shares the win of the 14th Eurovision Song Contest, in a four-way tie with Spain, the United Kingdom and the Netherlands. Frida Boccara represents France, singing "Un jour, un enfant".

Debuts
20 January - Les Animaux du monde (1969-1990)
10 July - Alain Decaux raconte (1969-1987)

Television shows

1940s
Le Jour du Seigneur (1949–present)

1950s
Discorama
Magazine féminin (1952-1970)
La Piste aux étoiles (1956-1978)
Présence protestante (1955-)

1960s
Dim Dam Dom (1965-1971)
La Tête et les Jambes (1960-1978)
La Caméra invisible (1964-1971)
Les Coulisses de l'exploit (1961-1972)
Les Dossiers de l'écran (1967-1991)
Monsieur Cinéma (1967-1980)
Colorix (1967-1973)
Télé-Philatélie

Ending this year
Chambre noire 
Voyage sans passeport (1957-1969)

Births
13 May - Nikos Aliagas, television presenter
26 September - Anthony Kavanagh, Haitian Canadian comedian, actor, singer & television personality
2 November - Claudy Siar, singer & TV & radio presenter

Deaths

See also
1969 in France
List of French films of 1969

References